908 may refer to:

 Area code 908
The year 908 AD
The year 908 BC
The number 908
The Peugeot 908 HDi FAP and Peugeot 908 racing cars.
The Porsche 908 racing car.
908 Buda, a minor planet orbiting the Sun.
908 Taiwan Republic Campaign, an umbrella organisation of activist groups for the goal of Taiwanese independence.